Paraná Soccer Technical Center, more commonly referred to as PSTC, is a Brazilian professional association football club in Cornélio Procópio, Paraná which currently plays in Campeonato Paranaense, the top division of the Paraná state football league.

History
The club was founded on August 15, 1994. PSTC competed in the Campeonato Paranense Third Level in 2010, when they were eliminated in the First Stage of the competition. They reached the Second Stage of the Campeonato Paranense Third Level in 2011, finishing in the fifth position overall in the competition.

In 2013, they started a partnership with the Cornélio Procópio municipality changed their name to PSTC Procopense. They won the Campeonato Paranaense - Segunda Divisão twice (2015 and 2019).

Stadium
Paraná Soccer Technical Center played their home games at CT de Londrina. The stadium has a maximum capacity of 1,000 people. Now they play at Estádio Municipal Ubirajara Medeiros in Cornélio Procópio.

References

Association football clubs established in 1994
Football clubs in Paraná (state)
Sport in Londrina
1994 establishments in Brazil